Beijing, mostly referred to as BJ, is a diesel-hydraulic locomotive used in the People's Republic of China. It is named after the capital city of China, Beijing.

BJ were made in two different versions, a standard version and a kou'an (port) version. China Railways DF7D, a diesel electric locomotive based on DF7B, has a similar appearance to the Beijing locomotive.

North Korea

From 2002 the Korean State Railway has received a number of BJ class locomotives second-hand from China. They are used mostly for heavy shunting and on local freight trains around P'yŏngyang. At least 33 have been delivered, numbered in the 내연301 - 내연333 series (내연 = Naeyŏn, "internal combustion"); most are still painted in their original Chinese blue livery, but a few have been repainted into the standard North Korean scheme of light blue over dark green, and at least one, 내연310, is painted in a scheme identical to the Chinese green livery used on Chinese DF4 locomotives.

References

Diesel locomotives of China
Locomotives of North Korea
B-B locomotives
Standard gauge locomotives of China
Standard gauge locomotives of North Korea
5 ft gauge locomotives
Railway locomotives introduced in 1970